A leuco dye (from the Greek λευκός leukos: white ) is a dye which can switch between two chemical forms; one of which is colorless. Reversible transformations can be caused by heat, light or pH; resulting in examples of thermochromism, photochromism and halochromism respectively. Irreversible transformations typically involve reduction or oxidation. The colorless form is sometimes referred to as the leuco form.

Leuco dyes form the basis of thermal printer papers and certain pH indicators.

Examples
The most common example is in applying sulfur dyes and vat dyes; with indigo being a classic case. This is characteristically purple but is also completely insoluble in water, meaning that it cannot be applied to clothes directly. It is instead reduced to indigo white (sometimes Leucoindigo), which is water-soluble but colorless. When a submerged fabric is removed from a dyebath of white indigo the dye quickly combines with oxygen in the air and reverts to the insoluble, intensely colored indigo. The reduction step is typically achieved with sodium dithionite, hydroxyacetone and hydrogen, or by electrochemical methods.

The spiro form of an oxazine is a colorless leuco dye; the conjugated system of the oxazine and another aromatic part of the molecule is separated by an sp3-hybridized "spiro" carbon. After protonating a part of the molecule, irradiation with UV light (see Photochromism), or introducing other kind of such change, the bond between the spiro carbon and the oxazine interrupts, the ring opens, the spiro carbon achieves sp2 hybridization and becomes planar, the aromatic group rotates, aligns its π-orbitals with the rest of the molecule, and a conjugated system forms, with ability to absorb photons of visible light, and therefore appear colorful.

Another example of a leuco dye is the crystal violet lactone, which in its lactone form is colorless or slightly yellowish, but in low pH, when it is protonated, it becomes intensely violet. Other examples are phenolphthalein and thymolphthalein, colorless in acidic to neutral pH, but becoming pink and blue in alkaline environment. Other example are many redox indicators, which undergo reversible color change between colored and colorless form at a specific electrode potential.

See also
Flexplay, trademark for a DVD-compatible optical video disk format that uses leuco dye to intentionally "wear away" after a limited number of playings.
Hypercolor, clothing that changes color with heat

References

Dyes